Armando.Info is a Venezuelan investigative journalism website that was founded in 2014. Armando.info is a long-term partner of the International Consortium of Investigative Journalists and has worked on many projects, including the two most recent projects, Panama Papers and Paradise Papers.

History
Spanish national newspaper El País said that the world would know little of the recent turmoil in Venezuela if not for the "in-depth reports" published by Armando.Info. It reports on all matters that contribute to the crisis in Venezuela, including corruption in other countries. One report on Mexican exploitation by overpricing CLAP boxes sold to the Venezuelan government even as it was filling them with expired food products won the website the ICFJ Knight Prize. However, since the report showed weakness in the government, many of the reporters had to flee the country in exile; they continued to investigate and brought the responsible company to trial in Colombia and put on a United States watchlist.

Operación Alacrán 

On 1 December, Armando.info published an investigation reporting that nine parliamentaries mediated in favor of two businessmen linked with the government. After the investigation was published, the deputies Luis Parra, José Brito, Conrado Pérez and José Gregorio "Goyo" Noriega were suspended and expelled from their parties Justice First and Popular Will.

The Venezuelan opposition alleged that they were targeted by what they described as a "campaign of bribery and intimidation" by Nicolás Maduro's government in December 2019. Venezuelan lawmakers and the US State Department said that opposition deputies, in parties led or allied with Guaidó, were being offered up to US$1 million to not vote for him. Luis Parra and other opposition deputies were removed from their parties following allegations that they were being bribed by Maduro. National Assembly deputies Ismael León and Luis Stefanelli directly accused Parra in December 2019 of attempting to bribe deputies to vote against Guaidó. Parra denied the allegations and said he was open to being investigated for corruption. Weeks prior to his investigation, Parra openly shared support for Guaidó and promoted his protest movement.

Deputy Delsa Solórzano accused Nicolás Maduro on CNN Radio Argentina of directing the operation. According to her, the government resorted to this method after failing to incarcerate or suspend the parliamentary immunity of the deputies, denouncing a considerable increase of political persecution as 5 January was approaching, explaining that security forces have gone to the houses of many deputies without alternates, and the only one with one, according to Solórzano, did accept the bribe.

On 3 January 2020, Nicmer Evans, a Caracas-based analyst, alleged that Maduro had managed to cause 14 deputies to not cast a vote for Guaidó through these tactics. Guaidó theoretically controlled 112 seats in the Assembly at the time, needing 84 votes to win.

Censorship

On 11 September 2018, the National Commission of Telecommunications (CONATEL) banned journalists from publishing information about Alex Saab in Armando.Info, whose journalist investigations point out Saab of being allegedly involved in corruption of his business and the CLAP food distribution network. The prohibition was denounced by the Press Workers Union Syndicate, who previously also denounced that Armando Info's website was the target of massive cybernetic attacks. Journalist Roberto Deniz condemned the decision, reminding that the team had been previously threatened in Twitter and were prohibited from exiting the country.

References

Venezuelan news websites
Media of the Crisis in Venezuela